Jorge Comas (born 8 February 1954, in Barcelona) is a Spanish former swimmer who competed in the 1972 Summer Olympics and in the 1976 Summer Olympics.

References

1954 births
Living people
Swimmers from Barcelona
Spanish male freestyle swimmers
Olympic swimmers of Spain
Swimmers at the 1972 Summer Olympics
Swimmers at the 1976 Summer Olympics
Mediterranean Games gold medalists for Spain
Swimmers at the 1971 Mediterranean Games
Mediterranean Games medalists in swimming
Swimmers at the 1975 Mediterranean Games